Mehmet Ali Aydınlar (born 24 July 1956 in Arapgir, Malatya Province) was the 39th President of the Turkish Football Federation. He is a minority shareholder and CEO of Turkey's leading hospital chain Acıbadem Healthcare Group.

Aydınlar began his career as a financial advisor in 1981, and began working for Acıbadem Hospital in 1993. In 2000, the business expanded to become the Acıbadem Healthcare Group, becoming the only Turkish medical provider to be listed on the Turkish stock market. He was a board member of the 38th Turkey Football Federation between 14 February 2008 and 29 June 2011 and Director of Fenerbahçe Acıbadem, which is a multi-sports club Fenerbahçe S.K.'s Women's Volleyball Branch between 2007 and 2011.

Accolades

Aydınlar received an honorary doctorate from the Kütahya Dumlupınar University.

References

External links
 Official Web Page of Acıbadem Healthcare Group
 Web Page of Acıbadem University

1956 births
Living people
People from Arapgir
Turkish chief executives
Turkish Football Federation presidents
Fenerbahçe S.K. board members
Turkish billionaires